The 112 megawatt (MW) Arada–Montemuro Wind Farm is an onshore Wind Farm in the Viseu district of Portugal.  It uses Enercon E-82 wind turbines.

In March 2007, there was 1,874 MW of wind power generating capacity installed in Portugal, with another 908 MW under construction.

It is owned and operated by EDF renewables but was developed by Eolica da Arada.

See also

References

Wind farms in Portugal